McCoy is an unincorporated community in Decatur County, Indiana, in the United States.

History
The McCoy post office was discontinued in 1899. William A. McCoy once served as postmaster.

References

Unincorporated communities in Decatur County, Indiana
Unincorporated communities in Indiana